Paraniphona is a genus of longhorn beetles of the subfamily Lamiinae, containing the following species:

 Paraniphona niphonoides Breuning, 1970
 Paraniphona rotundipennis Breuning, 1974

References

Pteropliini